Timothy Fedewa (born May 9, 1967) is an American professional racing driver. He has formerly competed in the NASCAR Busch Series, NASCAR Craftsman Truck Series, American Speed Association and ARTGO. Fedewa is a spotter in the NASCAR Cup Series and NASCAR Xfinity Series, serving in that role for Stewart-Haas Racing drivers Kevin Harvick and Riley Herbst.

Family
Tim's father Butch was also a racing driver.

He is married to model Kellee Meadows and they have one child, Willow Josephine Fedewa, born on January 8, 2009.

Career

After winning Rookie of the Year award in the ARTGO Challenge Series Fedewa went on to join the American Speed Association. Fedewa scored one top five finish. A third place at Winchester (Indiana) Speedway, And five top 10s on his way to the ASA's Pat Schauer rookie of the award in 1991. During Fedewa's time in the ASA his car owners Ray and Diane Dewitt also owned the RaDIUS team that fielded cars for former ASA standout Ted Musgrave. Fedewa drove the No. 55 D-R Racing Enterprises Ford. Fedewa's NASCAR career began when he started racing full-time in the NASCAR Busch Series for the 1993 season. He would finish second for Rookie of the Year honors, and in the five years that followed, he won three races and finished in the top-ten in points four times; his highest finishes were 7th in both 1995 and 1998. He began piloting the No. 36 Chevrolet Monte Carlo in 1999 and would continue to for two-and-a-half years, until he and the team parted ways during the 2001 season.

After acting as spotter to Bill Elliott and then later to Kerry Earnhardt, he was ironically hired by FitzBradshaw Racing in 2003 to replace Earnhardt in the No. 12 Dodge. In racing for the team, Fedewa reached as high as 9th in the 2004 points standings before dropping to 16th by the end of the season. Fedewa's 2nd-place finish stands as the best finish of any Fitz Bradshaw driver ever.

In 2005, Fedewa failed to finish in the top-ten in twenty-one Busch Series starts, and was subsequently released by FitzBradshaw Racing on July 25, 2005. A week later, he was signed by Glynn Motorsports, a NASCAR Craftsman Truck Series team, to drive the No. 65 Dodge. He raced in seven events for the team; his highest finish was 10th at Las Vegas Motor Speedway. Since then, he has not participated in a NASCAR race.

Fedewa made one Cup start in 1994 for Ray DeWitt at Dover; he finished 23rd. He made a brief return to the series in 2000 in a relief appearance at the Coca-Cola 600, substituting for injured Petty Enterprises driver John Andretti.

Other

Fedewa spotted for A. J. Allmendinger when he drove the No. 84 Red Bull Racing Team Toyota Camry in the NEXTEL Cup Series; Fedewa also spotted for No. 82 Red Bull Camry of Scott Speed. In the 2014 season, Fedewa helped guide Kevin Harvick to the 2014 NASCAR Sprint Cup Series championship as spotter of the No. 4 Chevrolet SS for Stewart-Haas Racing.

Motorsports career results

NASCAR
(key) (Bold – Pole position awarded by qualifying time. Italics – Pole position earned by points standings or practice time. * – Most laps led.)

Winston Cup Series

Busch Series

Craftsman Truck Series

ARCA Bondo/Mar-Hyde Series
(key) (Bold – Pole position awarded by qualifying time. Italics – Pole position earned by points standings or practice time. * – Most laps led.)

References

External links
 

1967 births
NASCAR drivers
American Speed Association drivers
Racing drivers from Michigan
Sportspeople from Lansing, Michigan
Living people
People from Holt, Michigan
Herzog Motorsports drivers
RFK Racing drivers